= Performing Arts and Culture Center =

The Performing Arts and Culture Center (stylized as Performing Arts + Culture Center) is a proposed performing arts venue on the Portland State University campus in Portland, Oregon, United States. The venue would accommodate approximately 3,000 people.
